Liam Noble (born 15 November 1968) is a British jazz pianist, composer, arranger and educator.

Early life
Noble was born in London on 15 November 1968. He studied music at the University of Oxford and at postgraduate level at the Guildhall School of Music.

Later life and career
After his studies, Noble played with saxophonist Stan Sulzmann in duo and quartet performances. He then played in several bands, including those led by Harry Beckett, John Stevens and Anita Wardell. In 1997, Noble joined Bobby Wellins' band. In 2002, he received a commission from Birmingham Jazz to write a song cycle.

Noble's 2004 recording Romance Among the Fishes was a quartet album, with Phil Robson (guitar), Drew Gress (bass) and Tom Rainey (drums). Noble and Robson had often played together, but the four had been put together earlier the same year for an appearance at the Cheltenham Jazz Festival. Noble's 2009 trio album, Brubeck, was described by the dedicatee, Dave Brubeck, as "an inspiration and a challenge for me to carry on in the avenues that you [Noble] have opened". In 2010, Noble accompanied vocalist Christine Tobin on the album Tapestry Unravelled, a reworking of Carole King's Tapestry from four decades earlier. In 2015, Noble will release the solo piano album A Room Somewhere.

Noble teaches at the Royal Academy of Music, Trinity Laban, the Birmingham Conservatoire and the University of Kent.

Compositions
Critic John Fordham, writing in 2005, commented that "Noble likes a mixture of staccato, drily witty themes that suggest a collision of Steve Coleman and Django Bates with Wayne Shorter – and with Canadian piano guru Paul Bley in the quieter episodes".

Discography
An asterisk (*) indicates that the year is that of release.

As leader/co-leader

As sideman

Main source:

References

External links
Noble's blog.

1968 births
British jazz pianists
Living people
21st-century pianists
FMR Records artists
Basho Records artists